Elymus is a genus of perennial plants with approximately 150 species in the grass family,  related to rye, wheat, and other widely grown cereal grains.

Elymus is a cosmopolitan genus, represented by species across all continents of the world.
Common names include couch grass, wildrye and wheatgrass.

Species 
Species accepted by the Plants of the World Online as of 2021:[1]

Elymus abolinii 
Elymus aenaeanus 
Elymus afghanicus 
Elymus africanus 
Elymus alaskanus 
Elymus albicans 
Elymus alienus 
Elymus alpinus 
Elymus altissimus 
Elymus amgensis 
Elymus angsaiensis 
Elymus angulatus 
Elymus angustispiculatus 
Elymus anthosachnoides 
Elymus antiquus 
Elymus × apiculatus 
Elymus arcuatus 
Elymus aristiglumis 
Elymus arizonicus 
Elymus athericus 
Elymus atratus 
Elymus bakeri 
Elymus barbicallus 
Elymus barystachyus 
Elymus borianus 
Elymus × brachyphyllus 
Elymus brevipes 
Elymus burchan-buddae 
Elymus buschianus 
Elymus cacuminis 
Elymus caesifolius 
Elymus caianus 
Elymus calcicola 
Elymus calderi 
Elymus californicus 
Elymus canadensis 
Elymus caninus 
Elymus caucasicus 
Elymus cheniae 
Elymus churchii 
Elymus ciliaris 
Elymus clivorum 
Elymus colorans 
Elymus confusus 
Elymus cordilleranus 
Elymus coreanus 
Elymus curtiaristatus 
Elymus curvatiformis 
Elymus curvatus 
Elymus × czilikensis 
Elymus czimganicus 
Elymus dahuricus 
Elymus debilis 
Elymus dentatus 
Elymus diversiglumis 
Elymus dolichatherus 
Elymus dolichorhachis 
Elymus × dorei 
Elymus dorudicus 
Elymus drobovii 
Elymus durus 
Elymus duthiei 
Elymus × ebingeri 
Elymus edelbergii 
Elymus elymoides 
Elymus erosiglumis 
Elymus fedtschenkoi 
Elymus festucoides 
Elymus fibrosus 
Elymus formosanus 
Elymus glaberrimus 
Elymus glaucissimus 
Elymus glaucus 
Elymus gmelinii 
Elymus grandis 
Elymus × hansenii 
Elymus himalayanus 
Elymus hirsutus 
Elymus hitchcockii 
Elymus hoffmannii 
Elymus hondae 
Elymus hongyuanensis 
Elymus hordeoides 
Elymus humidorum 
Elymus humilis 
Elymus hybridus 
Elymus hystrix 
Elymus × incertus 
Elymus × interjacens 
Elymus interruptus 
Elymus intramongolicus 
Elymus ircutensis 
Elymus jacquemontii 
Elymus jacutensis 
Elymus karakabinicus 
Elymus khokhrjakovii 
Elymus kuramensis 
Elymus lancangensis 
Elymus lanceolatus 
Elymus laxinodis 
Elymus lazicus 
Elymus leiotropis 
Elymus lenensis 
Elymus lolioides 
Elymus longearistatus 
Elymus longifolius 
Elymus macgregorii 
Elymus macrochaetus 
Elymus macrourus 
Elymus magellanicus 
Elymus magnicaespes 
Elymus magnipodus 
Elymus × maltei 
Elymus margaritae 
Elymus × mayebaranus 
Elymus mendocinus 
Elymus × mossii 
Elymus multisetus 
Elymus mutabilis 
Elymus nakaii 
Elymus nepalensis 
Elymus nipponicus 
Elymus nodosus 
Elymus × nothus 
Elymus nutans 
Elymus × palmerensis 
Elymus panormitanus 
Elymus patagonicus 
Elymus pendulinus 
Elymus petrovii 
Elymus praeruptus 
Elymus probatovae 
Elymus pseudocaninus 
Elymus × pseudorepens 
Elymus puberulus 
Elymus pulanensis 
Elymus pungens 
Elymus purpurascens 
Elymus qingnanensis 
Elymus repens 
Elymus retroflexus 
Elymus rhodopaeus 
Elymus riparius 
Elymus russellii 
Elymus sajanensis 
Elymus × saundersii 
Elymus × saxicola 
Elymus scabridulus 
Elymus scabrifolius 
Elymus scabriglumis 
Elymus schrenkianus 
Elymus schugnanicus 
Elymus sclerophyllus 
Elymus scribneri 
Elymus semicostatus 
Elymus serotinus 
Elymus serpentinus 
Elymus shandongensis 
Elymus shirazicus 
Elymus shouliangiae 
Elymus sibinicus 
Elymus sibiricus 
Elymus sikkimensis 
Elymus sinkiangensis 
Elymus sinoflexuosus 
Elymus sinosubmuticus 
Elymus smithii 
Elymus × spurius 
Elymus stebbinsii 
Elymus stenostachyus 
Elymus strictus 
Elymus svensonii 
Elymus sylvaticus 
Elymus tenuis 
Elymus tenuispicus 
Elymus texensis 
Elymus tibeticus 
Elymus tilcarensis 
Elymus transhyrcanus 
Elymus trichospicula 
Elymus tridentatus 
Elymus troctolepis 
Elymus tsukushiensis 
Elymus uralensis 
Elymus × versicolor 
Elymus villosus 
Elymus violaceus 
Elymus virginicus 
Elymus viridulus 
Elymus vulpinus 
Elymus wawawaiensis 
Elymus yangiae 
Elymus × yukonensis 
Elymus yushuensis 
Elymus zadoiensis 
Elymus zejensis 
Elymus zhui

Older classifications 
Many species once considered members of Elymus are now regarded as better suited to other genera: Agropyron, Anthosachne, Brachypodium, Cenchrus, Crithopsis, Heteranthelium, Jouvea, Kengyilia, Leymus, Psathyrostachys, Stenostachys, Taeniatherum, Thinopyrum etc.

References

External links 
 
 Jepson Manual Treatment
 Factsheet from The Intermountain Herbarium - Utah State University

 
Poaceae genera
Grasses of Asia
Grasses of Europe
Grasses of North America
Grasses of South America
Taxa named by Carl Linnaeus